Shallow Grave is a 1994 British black comedy crime film directed by Danny Boyle, in his feature directorial debut, and starring Ewan McGregor, Christopher Eccleston, and Kerry Fox. Its plot follows a group of flatmates in Edinburgh who set off a chain of events after dismembering and burying a mysterious new tenant who died and left behind a large sum of money. The film was written by John Hodge, marking his first screenplay.

The production was funded by Channel 4 Television and PolyGram Filmed Entertainment, and the film was distributed by Rank Film Distributors in the UK, while Columbia TriStar Film Distributors International distributed the film in other countries. Shallow Grave received generally favourable reviews from critics and was a commercial success, grossing $19.8 million worldwide.

Plot 
Chartered accountant David Stephens (Eccleston) delivers a monologue to camera about friendship. He shares a flat in Edinburgh with physician Juliet Miller (Fox) and journalist Alex Law (McGregor). Needing a new flatmate, they interview several applicants in a calculatedly cruel manner, amusing themselves at the applicants' expense before finally offering the room to a mysterious man named Hugo (Keith Allen). Shortly after Hugo moves in the trio finds him dead from an apparent drug overdose in his room, as well as a large suitcase full of money. They agree to conceal Hugo's death and keep the money for themselves. They bury the body in the woods after removing the hands and feet to prevent identification. They draw lots and David is given the gruesome task of dismembering the corpse, while Juliet disposes of the hands and feet in her hospital's incinerator.

Unknown to them, Hugo is being sought by a pair of violent men who are torturing and murdering informants as they follow Hugo's trail. The flat below theirs is broken into, making them anxious. The police, who also notice the intrusion, are surprised when the three deny that they ever had a fourth flatmate. While Juliet and Alex spend part of the money to "feel better", David's fears turn into full-blown paranoia. He hides the suitcase of money in the attic and begins living there, drilling holes in the attic floor to watch the living space below. The relationship between the three becomes increasingly strained and distrustful.

The men trailing Hugo break into the flat, coercing Alex and Juliet to reveal where the money is. As the men enter the dark attic, David kills both of them with a hammer and returns to the woods to dispose of the bodies. Alex and Juliet become worried about his mental state, and David becomes worried that the two are conspiring against him. With police closing in, Juliet seduces David into getting her the money needed to secretly buy a plane ticket to Rio de Janeiro. Matters come to a head after the three bodies are discovered in the woods, and Alex is sent by his editor to cover the story. Alex returns to find Juliet and David have reached an understanding about their shared plans, which excludes him. Fearing for his life, Alex tries to secretly phone investigators, but he is interrupted by David and Juliet. The confrontation quickly escalates into a violent three-way fight. David reveals that he knows Juliet's secret plan to betray them and punches her, prompting Alex to attack him too. During the battle David stabs Alex in the shoulder, but Juliet kills David before he can finish the job.

With David dead, Juliet betrays Alex and tells him that he can't come with her. She then forces the knife deeper into Alex's shoulder, pinning him to the floor, before fleeing to the airport with the suitcase of money. At the airport, she discovers that she has been tricked and cries hysterically: the suitcase is not filled with money, but with hundreds of headline clippings about the triple grave taken from Alex's newspaper. Devastated, with no possessions except her plane ticket, and knowing that she will soon be wanted for murder, Juliet boards the plane.

The police arrive at the flat to find Alex still skewered to the floor and grinning. The camera pans down, following the trajectory of the knife and through the floor of the flat, to reveal that Alex had hidden the missing bundles of cash under the floorboards.

David finishes the monologue that began the film (which is now revealed to be occurring after he was dead), before a sheet is drawn over his face and his body is slid into a drawer in the morgue.

Cast 

 Kerry Fox as Juliet Miller: A spirited and mysterious doctor who is constantly being courted by different men, many of whom repeatedly call the flat trying to speak to her. Despite this, she also appears to be in a relationship with David as well as openly flirting with Alex.
 Christopher Eccleston as David Stephens: A shy chartered accountant who keeps a low profile. After drawing the short straw and having to cut up the body, he becomes introverted and paranoid.
 Ewan McGregor as Alex Law: A cheeky, vain, and self-described "hack" journalist. Alex works for the local paper and is able to find out inside information of the police investigation. His confidence in their plot starts to be undermined by David's deteriorating mental health.
 Ken Stott as Detective Inspector McCall
 Keith Allen as Hugo: An enigmatic man who rents the spare room under the pretense of being a writer. He is later found dead after a drug overdose, leaving a suitcase full of money under his bed.
 Colin McCredie as Cameron: A potential flatmate who is interviewed at the beginning of the film. He is ridiculed and then thrown out by Alex and the housemates. Later, at a party, he punches Alex after being mocked again.
 Victoria Nairn as Woman Visitor: The "identify this song" potential flatmate.
 Gary Lewis as Male Visitor: The "not having an affair" potential flatmate.
 Jean Marie Coffey as Goth: A potential flatmate.
 Peter Mullan as Andy: A murderous thug searching for Hugo and the money.
 Leonard O'Malley as Tim: A murderous thug searching for Hugo and the money.

In addition, the film's screenwriter, John Hodge, appears in the role of Detective Constable Mitchell, whose main duty appears to be writing: "Make a note of that, Mitchell. ... Write it down."

Production 
Shooting for Shallow Grave lasted for thirty days. The tight budgetary restraints during filming meant many of the props had to be auctioned off for them to afford sufficient film stock.

Boyle claimed that Christopher Eccleston was so afraid of getting locked in a real-life mortuary for a scene, he had to ask a crew member to stand in the shadows and comfort the nervous actor.

Danny Boyle said in his commentary on the 2009 Special Edition DVD and 2012 Blu-ray that Alex is not meant to be dead, so the line of Alex saying hello to the detective was added in post-production to clarify this.

Filming locations 
The crew shot predominantly in Glasgow rather than Edinburgh, which is where the story is set, since the Glasgow Film Fund gave them a £150,000 (£ today) grant.

Locations in the film include:
 Flat 6 North East Circus Place, New Town, Edinburgh
 Hospital scenes were filmed at Royal Alexandra Hospital in Paisley, Renfrewshire
 The dance scene was filmed at the Townhouse Hotel, 54 West George Street, near George Square in Glasgow

Reception  

The film was the most commercially successful British film of 1995 with a gross of £5.2 milion. The film was a success in Europe, but grossed a total of just $2,834,250 in the United States. It led to Boyle's internationally successful production, Trainspotting, two years later. Shallow Grave earned Boyle the Best Newcomer Award from the 1996 London Film Critics Circle and, together with Trainspotting, led to critical commentary that Boyle had revitalised British cinema in the early 1990s.

 On Metacritic, the film has a weighted average score of 67 out of 100 based on 20 critic reviews, indicating "generally favorable reviews".

Caroline Westbrook of Empire magazine gave it 5 out of 5 and wrote: "This, the debut feature from acclaimed TV director Danny Boyle, is the best British thriller for years, a chilling and claustrophobic heart-stopper centring on a moral dilemma destined to fuel many a dinner party conversation." Quentin Curtis of The Independent on Sunday wrote: "What makes the film fascinating, and exciting, is its marriage of British setting and American, B-movie format."

Derek Elley of Variety magazine called it "a tar-black comedy that zings along on a wave of visual and scripting inventiveness."

Roger Ebert of the Chicago Sun-Times gave it 2 out of 4, and wrote "All of the materials are in place [...] But somehow they never come together." Janet Maslin of The New York Times was critical of the film and said "misanthropy overwhelms his film in ways that prove more sour than droll, despite the presence of skillful actors and a bizarrely enveloping plot."

Awards 
 1995 Angers European First Film Festival
 Audience Award – Feature Film
 Best Screenplay – Feature Film
 Liberation Advertisement Award
 1995 BAFTA – Alexander Korda Award for Best British film (shared with Andrew Macdonald)
 1995 Cognac Festival du Film Policier
 Audience Award
 Grand Prix
 1994 Dinard British Film Festival
 Golden Hitchcock
 1st Empire Awards (1996)
 Empire Award for Best British Film
 Empire Award for Best Director
 Empire Award for Best British Actor
 1995 Evening Standard British Film Award
 Most Promising Newcomer for Danny Boyle
 1995 Fantasporto (Portugal)
 International Fantasy Film Award – Best Film
 1994 San Sebastian International Film Festival
 Silver Seashell – Best Director

Music 

 Track listing 
 Leftfield – "Shallow Grave" – 4:38
 Simon Boswell – "Shallow Grave Theme" – 3:30
 Nina Simone – "My Baby Just Cares for Me" – 3:38
 Simon Boswell – "Laugh Riot" – 3:02
 Leftfield – "Release the Dubs" – 5:45
 John Carmichael Band – "Strip the Willow" – 3:12
 Simon Boswell – "Loft Conversion" – 5:45
 Simon Boswell – "A Spade, We Need a Spade" – 2:41
 Simon Boswell – "Shallow Grave, Deep Depression" – 4:49
 Simon Boswell – "Hugo's Last Trip" – 5:39
 Andy Williams – "Happy Heart" – 3:11

References

External links 

 
 Shallow Grave review at Cult Fiction
 Shallow Grave: A Film Called Cruel an essay by Philip Kemp at the Criterion Collection

1994 crime thriller films
1994 directorial debut films
1994 films
Best British Film BAFTA Award winners
British crime thriller films
British independent films
1990s English-language films
English-language Scottish films
Films directed by Danny Boyle
Films scored by Simon Boswell
Films set in Edinburgh
Films shot in Edinburgh
Films shot in Scotland
Films with screenplays by John Hodge
Film4 Productions films
PolyGram Filmed Entertainment films
Scottish films
Trainspotting
1990s British films